Tabitha Solomon (born 1901) was one of the first women to qualify as a dentist in India, graduating from the Calcutta Dental College and Hospital in 1928. After graduation she started a dental clinic in the Chittarnjan Seva Sadan Hospital and worked at the Dufferin Hospital. A member of the Baghdadi Jewish community, she was closely involved in Jewish community causes.

Early life and education
Tabitha Solomon was born in 1901 into the Baghdadi Jewish expatriate community in British India. She was one of the first women to qualify as a dentist in India, graduating from the Calcutta Dental College and Hospital (later the Dr R. Ahmed Dental College) with her Licentiate in Dental Science on 30 March 1928, five years after the only known earlier female candidate Fatima Ali Jinnah, who qualified in 1923 from the same College, and sixteen years before Vimla Sood, who qualified in dentistry from De'Montmorency College of Dentistry in Lahore in 1944.

Career
Solomon worked with Rafiuddin Ahmed on the Calcutta Dental Journal and started a dental clinic in the Chittarnjan Seva Sadan Hospital. She worked at the Dufferin Hospital in an honorary capacity.

She was closely involved in Jewish causes, serving on the Women's International Zionist Organization (WIZO) and welfare committees, the Calcutta Jewish Association and the multicultural Calcutta Women's Committee.

Personal life
Tabitha Solomon had two sons and a daughter, Eric, Charles and Hebe.  Avi is Charles' older son born in 1956.

References

External links 
Remembering Tabitha Solomon,the first Indian woman dentist. White Coat Nerd.

Jewish women
Women dentists
1901 births
Indian women
Baghdadi Jews
Year of death unknown
Indian dentists
Medical doctors from Kolkata
1976 deaths
20th-century dentists